Manoharpur Assembly constituency is an assembly constituency in the Indian state of Jharkhand.

Election Results

2019

See also
Vidhan Sabha
List of states of India by type of legislature

References

Politics of Jharkhand
Assembly constituencies of Jharkhand